Tchokola is an album by French jazz fusion artist Jean-Luc Ponty, released in 1991.

The rhythm section was recorded on analog tape. All other recording was digitally recorded.

Track listing 
 "Mam'maï" (Abdou M'Boup, Willy N'For, Jean-Luc Ponty) – 6:00
 "Sakka Sakka" (Myriam Betty, N'For, Guy N'Sangue, Brice Wassy) – 5:22
 "Tchokola" (Wassy) – 5:47
 "Mouna Bowa" (N'sangue, Ponty) – 6:32
 "N'Fan Môt" (Ponty, Wassy) – 6:10
 "Yéké Yéké" (Mory Kanté) – 4:58
 "Bamako" (Yves N'Djock, Ponty, Wassy) – 4:31
 "Rhum 'N' Zouc" (Ponty) – 5:04
 "Cono" (Salif Keita) – 4:56
 "Bottle Bop" (NDjock, Nsangue, Wassy) – 4:49

Personnel 
Jean-Luc Ponty – violin, keyboards, electric violin and viola
Martin Atangana – guitar
Yves N'Djock – guitar
Guy N'Sangue – bass
Brice Wassy – drums, percussion
Moustapha Cisse – percussion
Angélique Kidjo – vocals
Myriam Betty – vocals
Esther Dobong'Na Essiène (aka Estha Divine)-vocals
Kémo Kouyaté – harp, background vocals, Balafon, Kora
Abdou M'Boup – percussion, bongos, vocals, Sabar, Tama, Bugarabu
Willy N'For – vocals
Production notes
Jean-Luc Ponty – producer
Brice Wassy – producer
Peter Kelsey – engineer, mixing
David Coleman – art direction, design
Nancy Donald – art direction

Charts

References

1991 albums
Jean-Luc Ponty albums
Epic Records albums